Rochester Hills is a city in Oakland County in the U.S. state of Michigan. As of the 2020 census, the city had a total population of 76,300. It is the 14th-largest city in Michigan.

The area was first occupied by settlers of European descent in 1817, and organized as Avon Township in 1835. The City of Rochester incorporated in 1967, while the remaining area of Avon Township was incorporated and renamed the City of Rochester Hills in 1984.

Communities
Yates is on the boundary with Rochester and Shelby Township, Oakland County (Elevation: 669 ft./204 m.).

History
Prior to European settlement, the area now known as Rochester Hills was inhabited by Native Americans, namely the Potawatomi. The Potawatomi depended on the area's abundant water sources, such as the Clinton River and Paint Creek, to grow crops, fish, and travel. They resided here until the 1807 Treaty of Detroit caused them, along with the Odawa, Wyandot, and Ojibwe peoples, to cede their land in Southeast Michigan.

The first European settler was James Graham who arrived in 1817. Graham and his family reached the area by following trails created by the Sauk Native Americans. Avon Township was organized in 1835. Rochester incorporated as a village within the township in 1869. The township adopted a charter in 1948 under the Home Rule Act. Also in 1948 a post office was established under the name of Brooklands for the area between Auburn Road and Hamlin Road just to the west of Dequindre Road.

In 1966, village residents voted to become the City of Rochester, effective in February 1967. As a result, Rochester residents no longer had to pay property taxes to the township, as it was now a separate municipality.

In 1967, Avon Township filed a petition to become a city. In January 1968, township voters approved the petition to move forward with seeking city status. Three proposed city charters were voted down by residents, the first in March 1969, the second in May 1970, and the third in September 1971. The city of Rochester then sought to annex all of the township, which was unanimously denied by the Michigan Boundary Commission. In 1972, petitions were filed to consolidate Avon Township and Rochester. In April 1974, the consolidation petition lost by 350 votes in the township, while passing by four votes in Rochester. In May 1974, Rochester's petition to annex  of Avon Township was approved by the Michigan Boundary Commission, depriving Avon Township of its largest taxpayer. The township became Avon Charter Township in August 1978. Court challenges to the 1974 annexation continued until November 1981, when the township was ordered to surrender the annexed property. An impending annexation request from the City of Troy, due south, for 300 acres of southeast Avon Township brought the cityhood question to a crisis.

In May 1984, township voters approved a city charter. On November 20, 1984, Avon Township became the City of Rochester Hills. The name of the new city was put to a vote, with the other choice being "Avon Hills." The name "Rochester Hills" won by a landslide with voters, based on the area's historical ties to Rochester and the rolling hills in the area. Township Supervisor Earl E. Borden became the first mayor of Rochester Hills.

Geography

Rochester Hills is bordered to the north by Oakland Charter Township along Dutton Road, to the south by the city of Troy along South Boulevard, to the east by Shelby Township in Macomb County along Dequindre Road, and to the west by the city of Auburn Hills along part of Adams Road. Rochester Hills is also partially bordered by the city of Rochester to the east.

Demographics

2020 census
As of the 2020 census, there were 76,293 people, in 28,766 households, residing in the city. The racial makeup of the city was 79.6% White, 12.8% Asian, 3.7% African American, 2.9% from two or more races, and 0.1% Native American. Hispanic or Latino of any race were 5.6% of the population. 19.8% of the population was foreign-born.

There were 28,766 households, and the median household income was $99,666. 4.2% of persons were living in poverty. 77.4% of residents lived in owner-occupied housing units.

Between 2000 and 2010, the Asian population in Rochester Hills increased to almost 10% of the community's population, a 61% increase from the 2000 figure. It grew to 12.8% in 2020.

2010 census 
As of the census of 2010, there were 70,995 people, 27,578 households, and 19,308 families residing in the city. The racial makeup of the city was 89.1% White, 2.5% African American, 0.2% Native American, 4.5% Asian, 0.7% from other races, and 1.9% from two or more races. Hispanic or Latino of any race were 1.1% of the population.

There were 27,578 households of which 33.2% had children under the age of 18 living with them, 59.2% were married couples living together, 8.1% had a female householder with no husband present, 2.8% had a male householder with no wife present, and 30.0% were non-families. 25.7% of all households were made up of individuals and 10.3% had someone living alone who was 65 years of age or older. The average household size was 2.53 and the average family size was 3.08.

The median age in the city was 40.9 years. 23.7% of residents were under the age of 18; 7.7% were between the ages of 18 and 24; 24.6% were from 25 to 44; 30.3% were from 45 to 64; and 13.8% were 65 years of age or older. The gender makeup of the city was 48.4% male and 51.6% female.

Government

Rochester Hills has a mayor-council government. The Rochester Hills City Council consists of seven Council Members: four district members and three at-large members. They are elected to four-year terms and, due to term limiting, can serve no more than two terms for a maximum of eight years. However, there are no limits on how many times the mayor can run for re-election as a write-in candidate.

Rochester Hills does not have a police department, so the city's police services are provided by the Oakland County Sheriff's Office. The 52nd District Court Division Three is also located in Rochester Hills.

In the 2020 United States presidential election in Michigan, 23,173 (50.67%) votes went to Joseph Biden and 21,680 (47.4%) votes were cast for Donald Trump.

Federally, Rochester Hills is gerrymandered between Michigan's 8th congressional district, represented by Democrat Elissa Slotkin, and Michigan's 11th congressional district, represented by Democrat Haley Stevens. However, as of 2023, Rochester Hills will be appended to the Macomb County-centered Michigan's 10th congressional district.

Education
Rochester Community Schools serve most of the city. Rochester Adams High School, Rochester High School, and Stoney Creek High School are in Rochester Hills. The city also hosts college and graduate-level programs in various disciplines at Oakland University and Rochester University.

Some portions of the city, however, are in the Avondale School District. Much of the ASD portion of Rochester Hills is zoned to Deerfield Elementary School, also within the city. Other portions are zoned to Auburn Elementary School in Auburn Hills and Woodland Elementary School in Troy. All ASD residents are zoned to Avondale Middle School in Rochester Hills and Avondale High School in Auburn Hills. The Meadows School, Avondale Academy, and the ASD transportation department are all in Rochester Hills.

City services include Rochester Hills Public Library. (The neighboring City of Rochester and Oakland Township contract with the City of Rochester Hills to permit their residents' use of the library.)

The Japanese School of Detroit, a supplementary school for Japanese citizens of school age, at one time had its administrative offices in the former Oakland Steiner School in Rochester Hills.

Notable people

This list includes people from Rochester and Rochester Hills:
 Mike Bishop, politician
 Tommy Clufetos, professional drummer
 Paul Davis, professional basketball player
 Eric Fisher, professional football player
 Hal Foster, artist and writer
 Amy Frazier, professional tennis player
 Jay Gibbons, professional baseball player
 Andrew Good, professional baseball player
 Idris Goodwin, playwright, poet, activist, professor
 Shawn Hare, professional baseball player
 Greg and Tim Hildebrandt, fantasy artists and painters of the original Star Wars movie poster
 Rude Jude, television and radio personality
 George Jamison, professional football player
 Bob Keselowski, NASCAR driver
 Brad Keselowski, NASCAR driver
 Brian Keselowski, NASCAR driver
 Walt Kowalczyk, professional football player
 Jana Kramer, country music singer and actress
 Madonna, pop singer and actress
 Alec Martinez, professional hockey player
 Craig Owens, lead singer of Chiodos and Cinematic Sunrise
 Roxy Petrucci, drummer of Vixen
 Brian Sell, marathoner
Haley Stevens, politician 
 Ron Teachworth, educator, artist, writer and filmmaker
 Dita von Teese, burlesque artist, model and actress
 Jacob Trouba, hockey player
 Peter Vanderkaay, Olympic gold medal swimmer
 Jason Varitek, professional baseball player
 Robert Simpson Woodward, physicist and mathematician
 George Zamka, NASA astronaut and Marine Corps pilot

References

Notes

Sources

External links

City of Rochester Hills
Rochester Public Library

 
Cities in Oakland County, Michigan
Metro Detroit
1984 establishments in Michigan
Populated places established in 1984